Dr Léon Bollendorff (31 March 1915 – 5 June 2011) was a Luxembourgish politician, teacher, and philologist. He was born in Wasserbillig. A member of the Christian Social People's Party, he sat in the Chamber of Deputies, of which he served as President (1979–1989).  He also sat on the communal council of Luxembourg City, holding office as échevin.

References
 Rulers: Luxembourg. Rulers.org. Accessed 2010-01-20.
 APPOINTMENT OF MEMBERS OF THE COMMITTEE OF THE REGIONS. European Union. Accessed 2010-01-20.
 Léon Bollendorff's obituary 

Presidents of the Chamber of Deputies (Luxembourg)
Members of the Chamber of Deputies (Luxembourg)
Councillors in Luxembourg City
Christian Social People's Party politicians
Luxembourgian educators
Philologists
1915 births
2011 deaths
People from Mertert